Zorawar Kalra (born 26 May 1977) is an Indian restaurateur. He is the son of Jiggs Kalra, the ‘Czar of Indian Cuisine’. He is the founder and managing director of Massive Restaurants Pvt Ltd, which owns brands such as Masala Library, Pa Pa Ya, Farzi Café, Made in Punjab and unique Asian eatery called Hotel ShangHigh. He hosted the season five of MasterChef India, replacing Sanjeev Kapoor.

Career 
With a family backdrop immersed in restaurants, food was always at the centre of family life while Zorawar Kalra was growing up in New Delhi. Taking the lead from his father, his first entrepreneurial venture, ZK Restaurant Concepts, was launched in 2006, followed by a number of successful casual and fine dining restaurants. Six years later, born out of a belief that every effort should be made to elevate the position of Indian cuisine across the globe, he founded Massive Restaurants.
Kalra now has 26 restaurants across nine brands in eight countries.

Television 
In 2016, Kalra hosted the fifth season of MasterChef India, a series based on the original British version, MasterChef, alongside Vikas Khanna and Kunal Kapur. Brands owned by Kalra are Masala Library, Made In Punjab, Farzi Cafe, Pa Pa Ya, Masala Bar, KODE, BBQ'D, Rivers TO Oceans, BO-TAI, YOUNION, TYGR, Mithai By Jiggs Kalra, Hotel ShangHigh, BO-TAI Switch, +94 Bombay, Swan, Butter Delivery, Louis Burgers.

In July 2022, Kalra announced his decision to participate in dance-based reality show Jhalak Dikhhla Jaa 10.

Filmography

Television

Awards 
Counted amongst one of the youngest, most successful restaurateurs of India, Zorawar Kalra reinvents Indian cuisine with his strong business acumen and a rich heritage spanning over four decades. Considered as the ‘Man with a Vision on a Mission’ & ‘The Prince of Indian Cuisine’, he has been recognized amongst the 50 Most Influential Young Indians by GQ India (thrice); GQ Men of the Year – Restauranteur of 2017; Economic Times 40 Under 40; Forbes Tycoons of Tomorrow; Restaurateur of the Year Award, 2014 & 2017, Times of India & Vir Sanghvi Awards; a Finalist in E&Y Entrepreneur of the year 2017; HT Crystals, 2014 and Entrepreneur of the Year in Service Business - F & B Services, Entrepreneur India Awards, 2014. December 2012 was a milestone for him, as it saw the launch of Massive Restaurants Pvt. Ltd., which in its first year of operations won over 19 prestigious awards under various categories. Zorawar Kalra has also been a judge on Masterchef India Season 5.

References 

Indian restaurateurs
Living people
1977 births
Indian businesspeople